Vriesea languida is a plant species in the genus Vriesea. This species is endemic to Brazil.

References

languida
Flora of Brazil